The sixth and final season of the American television series Parenthood premiered on September 25, 2014, and concluded on January 29, 2015. The season order consists of 13 episodes. As part of the budget cuts made by NBC so that the series would have a sixth season, none of the main cast members appears in every episode. The season five budget was reportedly $3.5 million per episode, but the season six budget was only $3 million per episode.

Cast

Main cast 
 Peter Krause as Adam Braverman
 Lauren Graham as Sarah Braverman
 Dax Shepard as Crosby Braverman
 Monica Potter as Kristina Braverman
 Erika Christensen as Julia Braverman-Graham
 Sam Jaeger as Joel Graham
 Savannah Paige Rae as Sydney Graham
 Xolo Maridueña as Victor Graham
 Max Burkholder as Max Braverman
 Joy Bryant as Jasmine Trussell
 Tyree Brown as Jabbar Trussell
 Miles Heizer as Drew Holt
 Mae Whitman as Amber Holt
 Bonnie Bedelia as Camille Braverman
 Craig T. Nelson as Zeek Braverman

Recurring cast 
 Mia Allan and Ella Allan as Nora Braverman
 Ray Romano as Hank Rizzoli 
 Coby Ryan McLaughlin as Chris Jefferies 
 Tina Lifford as Renee Trussell
 Lyndon Smith as Natalie
 Courtney Grosbeck as Ruby Rizzoli
 Betsy Brandt as Sandy
 Ally Ioannides as Dylan Jones
 Isaac Salzman as Aaron Brownstein
 Leland Crooke as Dr. Leland Gordon

Special guest star 
 Sarah Ramos as Haddie Braverman (2 episodes)

Episodes

Ratings

References 

2014 American television seasons
2015 American television seasons
Parenthood (2010 TV series)